Arthur Terence Galt MacDermot (December 18, 1928 – December 17, 2018) was a Canadian-American composer, pianist and writer of musical theater.  He won a Grammy Award for the song "African Waltz" in 1960.  His most-successful musicals were Hair (1967; its cast album also won a Grammy) and Two Gentlemen of Verona (1971).  MacDermot also composed music for film soundtracks, jazz and funk albums, and classical music, and his music has been sampled in hit hip-hop songs and albums. He is best known for his work on Hair, which produced three number-one singles in 1969: "Aquarius/Let the Sunshine In", "Good Morning Starshine", and the title song "Hair".

Biography

MacDermot was born in Montreal, the son of Canadian diplomat Terence MacDermot and Elizabeth Savage. He was educated at Upper Canada College and Bishop's University (Sherbrooke, Quebec, Canada).  He received a bachelor's degree in music from Cape Town University, South Africa, and made a study of African music his specialty. He studied the piano privately with Neil Chotem. 

It was also during his time at Cape Town where he would meet his future wife, Marlene Bruynzeel, a clarinetist of Dutch descent. They married in 1956 and had five children.

MacDermot won his first Grammy Award for the Cannonball Adderley recording of his song "African Waltz" (the title track of the album of the same name) in 1960. 

MacDermot moved to New York City in 1964 where, three years later, he wrote the music for the hit musical Hair, which he later adapted for the 1979 film of the same name. Its Broadway cast album won a Grammy Award in 1969, and the musical generated three number-one singles that year: "Aquarius/Let the Sunshine In", "Good Morning Starshine", and the title song "Hair". His next musicals were Isabel's a Jezebel (1970) and Who the Murderer Was (1970), which featured British progressive rock band Curved Air.

MacDermot had another hit with the musical Two Gentlemen of Verona (1971), which won the Tony Award for Best Musical. For that show, MacDermot was nominated for a Tony for best music and won the Drama Desk Award for Outstanding Music. His later musicals, including Dude and Via Galactica (both 1972) and The Human Comedy (1984), were not successful on Broadway.

MacDermot's film soundtracks include Cotton Comes to Harlem, a 1970 blaxploitation film starring Godfrey Cambridge, Raymond St. Jacques, and Redd Foxx, based on Chester Himes's novel of the same name; Rhinoceros (1974) starring Zero Mostel and Gene Wilder, and directed by original Broadway Hair director Tom O'Horgan; and Mistress (1992). He wrote his own orchestrations and arrangements for his theater and film scores.

In 1979, MacDermot formed the New Pulse Jazz Band, which performed and recorded his original music and was one of the first jazz bands to feature synthesizer. The band played as part of the on-stage band in the 2009 Broadway revival of Hair.  MacDermot's oeuvre also includes ballet scores, chamber music, the Anglican liturgy, orchestral music, poetry, incidental music for plays, band repertory, and opera.

In 2009, MacDermot was inducted into the Songwriter's Hall of Fame.

On November 22, 2010, MacDermot was awarded the Lifetime Achievement Award by SOCAN at the 2010 SOCAN Awards in Toronto.

Death
MacDermot died at his home in Staten Island, New York on December 17, 2018, the day before his 90th birthday. 

His identical twin daughters and caregivers,
Bonnie “Nummy” Jolanthe MacDermot and Sarah “Sassy” Rowena MacDermot, 
died one day apart in November 2020 at the age of 55, also in Staten Island, New York, where they were born on February 8, 1965. Sarah died on November 7 from undisclosed causes, and Jolanthe -- who had battled stage four breast cancer -- died one day later, on November 8, 2020.

Samples and other use

MacDermot's music is popular with collectors of jazz and funk.  Working with jazz musicians such as Bernard Purdie, Jimmy Lewis, and Idris Muhammad, MacDermot created pieces that prefigured the funk material of James Brown. In more-recent decades, his work became popular with hip hop musicians including Busta Rhymes, who sampled "Space" from MacDermot's 1969 record Woman Is Sweeter for the smash-hit "Woo-Hah!! Got You All in Check", and Run DMC, which sampled the Hair song "Where Do I Go?" in its Grammy Award-winning "Down with the King". Handsome Boy Modelling School ("The Truth"), DJ Vadim, DJ Premier and Oh No have all sampled the same segment from "Coffee Cold", from Shapes of Rhythm (1966).

Scottish electronica duo Boards of Canada used a loop in their track "Aquarius" (Music Has the Right to Children) which was sampled from MacDermot's song of the same name from the 1979 soundtrack of the film Hair. 

As part of his Special Herbs series, rapper MF DOOM sampled three MacDermot songs from Woman Is Sweeter: "Cathedral" for his song "Pennyroyal", "Space" for "Cinquefoil", and "Princess Gika" for "Styrax Gum". "Cathedral" is also sampled in Westside Gunn's "Dear Winter Bloody Fiegs" for his 2015 mixtape Hitler Wears Hermes 3. In 2006, rapper and producer Oh No released an album produced completely with MacDermot samples, titled Exodus into Unheard Rhythms.

Shows
 My Fur Lady (1957)
 Hair (1967)
 Isabel's a Jezebel (1970)
 Who the Murderer Was (1970)
 Two Gentlemen of Verona (1971)
 Dude (1973)
 Via Galactica (1973)
 The Human Comedy (1984)
 The Special (1985)
 Time and the Wind (1995)
 The Legend of Joan of Arc (1997)
 Sun (1998)
 Blondie (1998)
 The Corporation (1999)
 Gone Tomoro (2009)

Discography

(excluding cast albums and soundtracks)
Art Gallery Jazz (1956)
African Waltz (1960)
The English Experience (1961)
Galt MacDermot by Arrangement (1963)
Shapes of Rhythm (1966)
Hair Cuts (1969)
Woman is Sweeter (1969)
Galt MacDermot's First Natural Hair Band (1970)
The Nucleus (1971)
Ghetto Suite (1972)
Salome Bey Sings Songs From Dude (1972)
The Highway Life (1973)
Take This Bread: A Mass in our Time (1973)
Memphis Dude (1973)
La Novela (1973)
The Karl Marx Play (1973)
New Pulse Jazz Band (1979)
O Babylon! (1980)
Pulse On! (1981)
New Pulse Jazz Band III (1983)
Boogie Man (1985)
Lost Conquest (Conquista Perdida) (1986)
Purdie as a Picture (1994)
Reflections of a Radically Right Wing Composer (1992)
The Thomas Hardy Songs (1997)
El Niño (1998)
Up from the Basement Volumes 1 & 2 (2000)
Corporation (2000)
Spotted Owl (2000)
Live In Nashville (2000)
Foolish Lover (2001)
Paul Laurence Dunbar in Song (2001)
Waiting For The Limo (2003)
In Film (2004)
Asian Suite (2005)
Many Faces of Song (2009)
Sun (2009)
The Sun Always Shines for the Cool (2014)
Air & Angels (2017)

References

External links
 and archival pages:
Galt MacDermot's Discography
Galt MacDermot's Free Streaming Music
Galt MacDermot's Full Biography
Galt MacDermot's New Pulse Jazz Band
Ear of the Heart: the Music of Galt MacDermot
Galt MacDermot's MySpace Page
Galt MacDermot's Photo Gallery

1928 births
2018 deaths
20th-century Canadian composers
20th-century Canadian pianists
21st-century Canadian composers
21st-century Canadian pianists
Anglophone Quebec people
Bishop's University alumni
Broadway composers and lyricists
Canadian emigrants to the United States
Canadian musical theatre composers
Canadian people of Jamaican descent
Grammy Award winners
 Galt MacDermot
Musicians from Montreal
South African College of Music alumni
Upper Canada College alumni
Writers from Montreal